Jerrold Laurence Samuels (May 3, 1938 – March 10, 2023) was an American singer, songwriter and record producer. Under the pseudonym Napoleon XIV, he achieved one-hit wonder status with the Top 5 hit novelty song "They're Coming to Take Me Away, Ha-Haaa!" in 1966. Samuels occasionally revisited the Napoleon XIV character to record other songs, usually comedy records with an insanity theme.

Under the name Scott David (his son's name), he co-wrote "As If I Didn't Know" with Larry Kusik, a top 10 hit for Adam Wade in 1961. Samuels also wrote "The Shelter of Your Arms", a top 20 hit for Sammy Davis Jr. in 1964.

Biography
Jerrod Laurence Samuels was born in Manhattan and was raised in the Bronx. He played the piano and wrote music throughout his childhood, and began his recording career in 1956 when he cut the single "Puppy Love"/"The Chosen Few" for the Vik Records subsidiary of RCA Victor Records.
In 1966, Samuels concocted "They're Coming to Take Me Away, Ha-Haaa!" while working at Associated Recording Studios in New York. The public found out his true identity when Cousin Brucie of WABC revealed his name. The record quickly climbed the charts, reaching the Top Ten nationally in just its third week on the Billboard Hot 100. It peaked at No. 3 and sold over one million copies, and was awarded a gold disc. In the Cash Box Top 100 the record even climbed to No. 1 for one week in its second week on the charts.

The success of the single inspired a Warner Bros. album of the same name in 1966 (reissued by Rhino in 1985), most of which continued with the mental illness theme (for example: "Bats In My Belfry" and "Split Level Head" which features different vocal parts in each stereo speaker. A second single of two recordings from that album was relatively unnoticed. His manager was Leonard Stogel.

In his later years, Samuels worked as a singer and agent who booked various performers in the Delaware Valley. In 1984, he founded the Jerry Samuels Agency, and later operated it with his second wife, Bobby. They retired in 2021.

Samuels was married twice; first to Rosemary Djivre, until divorcing in 1968, and then to Bobby Simon from 1996 until his death. He was also in a relationship with Petra Vesters from 1973 to 1987. He had a son from his first marriage and another from his relationship to Vesters. Another son predeceased him. Samuels lived in the Philadelphia suburb of King of Prussia, Pennsylvania.

On March 10, 2023, Samuels died in Phoenixville, Pennsylvania, at the age of 84, from Parkinson's disease dementia.

Discography

Singles
 1966 "They're Coming to Take Me Away, Ha-Haaa!" / "!aaaH-aH ,yawA eM ekaT oT gnimoC er'yehT" Warner Bros. (5831)
 1966 "I'm in Love with My Little Red Tricycle" / "Doin' The Napoleon" Warner Bros. (5853)
 1973 "They're Coming To Take Me Away, Ha-Haa!" / "!aaH-aH ,yawA eM ekaT oT gnimoC er'yehT" Warner Bros. (WB 7726) (re-issue of WB 5831)
 1990 "They're Coming To Take Me Away, Ha-Haa!" (1966 recording) / "They're Coming To Get Me Again, Ha-Haaa!" (Recorded in 1988) Collectables (3859)
 They're Coming To Take Me Away, Ha-Haaa! / Photogenic, Schizophrenic You (Eric Records single, 1970s)

Albums

1966 They're Coming to Take Me Away, Ha-Haaa! 
Warner Bros. LP W 1661/WS 1661

Side 1
 "I'm in Love with My Little Red Tricycle"
 "Photogenic, Schizophrenic You"
 "Marching Off To Bedlam"
 "Doin' The Napoleon"
 "Let's Cuddle Up in My Security Blanket"
 "They're Coming To Take Me Away, Ha-Haaa!"

Side 2
 "Bats in My Belfry"
 "Dr. Psyche, The Cut-Rate Head-Shrinker"
 "I Live in a Split Level Head"
 "The Nuts on My Family Tree"
 "The Place Where The Nuts Hunt The Squirrels"
 "I'm Happy They Took You Away, Ha-Haaa!" (by Josephine XV)

1985 Reissue
Reissue of above on Rhino LP 816.

NOTE: The backwards version of the album title track does not appear on either the original or reissue albums, although the backwards title is listed on the front cover.

1996 The Second Coming
Rhino / WEA/Rhino R2 72402
 "Ode To A Farmer Boy" (New Recording 1995)
 "The Explorer" (previously unreleased, recorded in 1968 for second unissued album, For God's Sake, Stop The Feces)
 "They're Coming To Take Me Away, Ha-Haaa!"
 "I'm In Love With My Little Red Tricycle"
 "Photogenic, Schizophrenic You"
 "Marching Off To Bedlam"
 "Doin' The Napoleon"
 "The Place Where The Nuts Hunt The Squirrels"
 "Let's Cuddle Up In My Security Blanket"
 "Goofin' On The Job" (Recorded in 1968)
 "Bats In My Belfry"
 "Dr. Psyche, The Cut-Rate Head-Shrinker"
 "I Live In A Split Level Head"
 "I'm Happy They Took You Away, Ha-Haaa!" – Josephine XV
 "The Nuts On My Family Tree"
 "I Owe A Lot To Iowa Pot" (New Recording – 1995)
 "Can You Dig It?" (Recorded in 1968)
 "The Song I Wrote For Robert Goulet" (New recording – 1995)
 "They're Coming To Get Me Again, Ha-Haaa!"
 "It May Appear Ridiculous" (New recording – 1995)
 "!aaaH-aH ,yawA eM ekaT oT gnimoC er'yehT" (unlisted bonus track)

References

External links

 
 

1938 births
2023 deaths
20th-century American male singers
American comedy musicians
American male songwriters
American talent agents
Deaths from Parkinson's disease
Deaths from dementia in Pennsylvania
People from Upper Merion Township, Pennsylvania
People from Manhattan
People from the Bronx
Record producers from New York (state)
Singers from New York City
Songwriters from New York (state)
Warner Records artists